Shorea confusa is a species of plant in the family Dipterocarpaceae. The species name is derived from Latin ( = confused) and refers to the fact that this species is often misidentified as Shorea virescens. S. confusa is endemic to Borneo. It is a light hardwood sold under the trade names of white meranti. S. confusa is found in at least three protected areas (Lambir National Park, Bukit Taviu and Ulu Telupid Forest Reserves), but is threatened elsewhere due to habitat loss.

References

confusa
Endemic flora of Borneo
Trees of Borneo